Samuel Lamar Franklin  (born February 2, 1996) is an American football strong safety for the Carolina Panthers of the National Football League (NFL). He played college football at Temple.

Early life and high school
Franklin grew up in Crystal River, Florida and attended Citrus High School, where he played wide receiver, safety and linebacker on the football team. He was recruited by the University of Massachusetts, but failed to qualify academically. He enrolled at East Coast Prep, where he  played alongside future Panthers teammate Myles Hartsfield for a post-graduate year to improve his grades and test scores.

College career
Franklin was a member of the Temple Owls for four seasons, starting as a defensive back before moving to linebacker. As a senior, he was the team's third-leading tackler with 68 tackles and had 7.5 tackles for loss. Franklin finished his collegiate career with 194 tackles including 24 tackles for loss, eight sacks, two interceptions, 10 pass breakups, three fumble recoveries and one forced fumble in 53 games played.

Professional career
Franklin was signed by the Carolina Panthers as an undrafted free agent on May 2, 2020, and made the team out of training camp. On October 18, Franklin had his first meaningful action against the Chicago Bears when Juston Burris was injured, making two tackles.
In Week 9 against the Kansas City Chiefs, Franklin recorded his first career sack on Patrick Mahomes during the 33–31 loss.

References

External links
Temple Owls bio
Carolina Panthers bio

1996 births
Living people
American football linebackers
Temple Owls football players
Carolina Panthers players
Players of American football from Florida
American football safeties